Pokruchinsky is a rural locality (a khutor) Sulyayevskoye Rural Settlement, Kumylzhensky District, Volgograd Oblast, Russia. The population was 429 as of 2010. There are 6 streets.

Geography 
Pokruchinsky is located in forest steppe, on Khopyorsko-Buzulukskaya Plain, on the bank of the Khopyor River, 36 km northwest of Kumylzhenskaya (the district's administrative centre) by road. Sidorovka is the nearest rural locality.

References 

Rural localities in Kumylzhensky District